This is a List of inns in Bucharest. The inns of Bucharest, Romania – monumental buildings that provided not only hospitality and leisure services but also warehouse and office space – played a major role in the economic and cultural development of the city from the late 17th to the early 19th century. Many of them were located on Lipscani.

 Constantin Vodă Inn
 Colțea Inn
 Filaret Inn
 Filipescu Inn
 Gabroveni Inn
 Greeks' Inn
 Hanul cu Tei
 Manuc's Inn
 Saint George's Inn
 Șerban Vodă Inn
 Zlătari Inn

See also
 List of buildings in Bucharest

References

 
Inns
Bucharest